
Gmina Poświętne is a rural gmina (administrative district) in Wołomin County, Masovian Voivodeship, in east-central Poland. Its seat is the village of Poświętne, which lies approximately 12 kilometres (7 mi) east of Wołomin and 30 km (18 mi) north-east of Warsaw.

Villages
Gmina Poświętne contains the villages and settlements of Choiny, Cygów, Czubajowizna, Dąbrowica, Helenów, Jadwiniew, Józefin, Kielczykowizna, Kolno, Krubki-Górki, Laskowizna, Małków, Międzyleś, Międzypole, Nadbiel, Nowe Ręczaje, Nowy Cygów, Ostrowik, Poświętne, Ręczaje Polskie, Rojków, Trzcinka, Turze, Wola Cygowska, Wola Ręczajska, Wólka Dąbrowicka and Zabraniec.

Neighbouring gminas
Gmina Poświętne is bordered by the town of Zielonka and by the gminas of Klembów, Stanisławów, Strachówka, Tłuszcz and Wołomin.

References

Polish official population figures 2006

Poswietne
Wołomin County